The Southwest Wisconsin Conference, commonly referred as the SWC, is a Wisconsin Interscholastic Athletic Association (WIAA) conference in southwest Wisconsin comprising the largest high schools in the area, including the school districts of Dodgeville, Lancaster, Platteville, Prairie du Chien, Richland Center, and River Valley.

History
The Southwest Wisconsin Conference was formed when the WIAA split the former Southwest Athletic League I and Southwest Athletic League II (SWAL I and SWAL II).  In 2002, Cuba City had asked for a realignment of SWAL, and under the conference constitution, this was to be done by placing the seven largest schools in SWAL I and the seven smallest in SWAL II. Under this arrangement, Boscobel High School would be reassigned to the SWAL I Conference, and the school resisted the proposal. In 2004, representatives of each school met to discuss possible solutions, and  it was decided that SWAL I and SWAL II would cease to exist. Instead, beginning in the 2005-2006 school year, the six schools from Dodgeville, Lancaster, Platteville, Prairie du Chien, Richland Center, and River Valley would be part of a new conference, later named the SWC.  The remaining eight schools, Boscobel, Cuba City, Darlington, Fennimore, Iowa-Grant, Mineral Point, Riverdale, and Southwestern, would become the Southwest Athletic League (SWAL).

Enrollment
Most of the SWC schools have experienced a drop in enrollment over the past decade. Enrollment in the 2009-2010 school year is:

ACT scores 
ACT composite scores for the 2008-2009 school year were:

Conference championships
Conference championships won through the 2009 fall season:

Conference champions by sport
Football
2005: Lancaster (7-0); WIAA Division 5 state champion
2006: Lancaster, Platteville (co-champions (6-1)), Lancaster was WIAA Division 5 state champion
2007: Lancaster, Platteville, Richland Center (co-champions, (5-2))
2008: Lancaster (7-0)
2009: Lancaster (5-0)

Boys' cross country
2005: Dodgeville/Mineral Point (5-0)
2006: Dodgeville/Mineral Point (5-0); WIAA 4th place, Division 2
2007: Dodgeville/Mineral Point (5-0)
2008: Platteville (5-0), WIAA 12th place, Division 2
2009: Platteville (4-1)

Girls' cross country
2005: Dodgeville/Mineral Point (5-0), WIAA Division 2 state champion; 
2006: Dodgeville/Mineral Point (5-0), WIAA Division 2 state champion
2007: Dodgeville/Mineral Point (5-0), WIAA 3rd place, Division 2
2008: Dodgeville/Mineral Point (5-0), WIAA 2nd place, Division 2
2009: Dodgeville/Mineral Point (5-0), WIAA 7th place, Division 2

Boys' soccer
2005: Richland Center (6-0)
2006: Platteville (8-1)
2007: Platteville (9-1-1)
2008: Platteville/Lancaster (12-0)
2009: Dodgeville/Mineral Point (11-1)

Volleyball
2005: Richland Center, River Valley (co-champions) (9-1)
2006: Richland Center (10-0)
2007: Richland Center (10-0)
2008: Richland Center (9-1)
2009: River Valley (10-0)

Boys' basketball
2005-06: Richland Center
2006-07: Dodgeville, Prairie du Chien, River Valley (co-champions)
2007-08: River Valley
2008-09: River Valley
2009-10: Prairie du Chien, River Valley (co-champions)

Girls' basketball
2005-06: Lancaster
2006-07: Richland Center
2007-08: Richland Center
2008-09: Richland Center
2009-10: Richland Center

Wrestling
2005-06: Lancaster
2006-07: Dodgeville
2007-08: River Valley
2008-09: River Valley
2009-10: Prairie du Chien, River Valley (co-champions)

Baseball
2006: Prairie du Chien
2007: Prairie du Chien, River Valley (co-champions); Platteville was WIAA Division 2 runner-up
2008: Prairie du Chien; WIAA Division 2 runner-up
2009: Prairie du Chien
2010: Prairie du Chien

Boys' track and field
2006: Platteville
2007: Platteville
2008: Platteville
2009: Platteville
2010: Platteville

Girls' track and field
2006: Platteville
2007: Platteville
2008: Platteville
2009: Platteville
2010: Platteville

Golf
2006: Platteville
2007: Platteville
2008: Platteville
2009: Lancaster
2010: Platteville

Softball
2006: Lancaster
2007: Lancaster
2008: Lancaster
2009: Lancaster
2010: Lancaster

Girls' soccer
2006: Dodgeville/Mineral Point, Platteville (co-champions)
2007: Platteville
2008: Platteville
2009: Platteville/Lancaster
2010: Platteville/Lancaster

References

External links
http://www.southwestwisconsinconference.org

Wisconsin high school sports conferences
High school sports conferences and leagues in the United States